Ion Mihăilescu (born 27 March 1916; date of death unknown) was a Romanian footballer and manager.

International career
Ion Mihăilescu played 15 games at international level for Romania, including six matches at the 1947 and 1948 Balkan Cup editions. In 1949, in a friendly against Albania which ended with a 4–1 victory, Mihăilescu was the team's captain and coach.

Honours

Player
Sportul Studențesc București
Cupa României runner-up: 1938–39

Manager
Rapid București
Cupa României runner-up: 1960–61, 1961–62

Notes

References

External links
 
 
 
 Ion Mihăilescu manager profile at Labtof.ro 

1916 births
Romanian footballers
Romania international footballers
Association football midfielders
Liga I players
FC Sportul Studențesc București players
FC Rapid București players
FC CFR Timișoara players
Romanian football managers
Romania national football team managers
FC Rapid București managers
FCV Farul Constanța managers
People from Fetești
Year of death missing